Melville Glacier, is a glacier in northwestern Greenland. Administratively it belongs to the Avannaata municipality.

This glacier was named by Robert Peary after Chief Engineer George W. Melville (1841 – 1912), Chief of the Bureau of Steam Engineering.

Geography 
The Melville Glacier discharges from the Greenland Ice Sheet and has its terminus in the northern side of the head of the Inglefield Fjord just north of Josephine Peary Island. Its last stretch lies between two nunataks: Mount Lee in the east separates it from the Farquhar Glacier to the east, and Mount Asserson, in the west, separates it from the Sharp Glacier to the west. 

The Melville Glacier flows roughly from NE to SW.

See also
List of glaciers in Greenland
Inglefield Fjord

References

External links
Identifying Spatial Variability in Greenland's Outlet Glacier Response to Ocean Heat
The recent regimen of the ice cap margin in North Greenland
Glaciers of Greenland